Nitin Seth is an Indian tech entrepreneur and author who served as the COO of Flipkart. He is currently serving as the CEO of Incedo, a US-based engineering services company. An alumnus of the Indian Institute of Management Lucknow, he has served as the Managing Director of Fidelity International in India. Nitin is often regarded as a leader in Indian IT, BPO and Analytics industries. He served as Chairperson of NASSCOM's GCC Council and was the Chairperson of the NASSCOM Regional Council (NRC) in Haryana, India. He is the co-founder of Plaksha University, a private science and technology university based in Punjab, India.

Education 
He graduated from the Indian Institute of Technology Delhi with a B.Tech degree. He holds an MBA from the Indian Institute of Management Lucknow.

Career 
He started his career with McKinsey and Company, where he worked for 14 years. He was serving as the director of McKinsey's Global Knowledge Centre in India (McKC) when he left the company.

Nitin Seth joined Flipkart as the chief people officer in February 2016, appointed by its co-founder Binny Bansal. In less than 6 months, he was promoted to Chief Administrative Officer. Later, in January 2017, he was made Chief Operations Officer of the company when Kalyan Krishnamurthy took over as Flipkart CEO from co-founder Binny Bansal, who took over as group CEO. During his tenure as the COO of Flipkart, he also assumed control of Flipkart's in-house logistics arm Ekart.

In May 2017, Seth resigned from the company, citing personal reasons, as reported by The Economic Times. Later, in July 2017, he served a legal notice to Flipkart, calling "his removal was illegal".

Before joining Flipkart, Nitin Seth worked as the managing director and Country Head of Fidelity International for 6 years, overseeing its offshore operations across India and Tunisia. In October 2017, Seth was appointed as CEO of Incedo Inc., a San Francisco-based engineering services company.

NASSCOM 
Nitin chaired the National Association of Software and Service Companies (NASSCOM) Regional Council for Haryana and helped create the IT policy for the Haryana. He has championed the development of the start-up ecosystem, creating a forward-looking IT Policy for the state and infrastructure improvements in Gurgaon, Haryana.

He set up and served as the chairman of the NASSCOM forum for Global In-house Centers (GICs) for North India and has led the industry-wide initiative to develop the vision and strategic roadmap for GICs. He was the Chairperson of the National GIC Council and was part of the NASSCOM Executive Council. He was the founding member of the NASSCOM GCC council.

Published work 
In 2021, Nitin authored a book titled, Winning in the Age of Digital, which was published by Penguin Random House. It reached the #18 Amazon Best Seller, as of July 2021.

The book won a silver medal at the Axiom Business Book Awards 2022 in the Business Technology category, a Gold Stevie at the International Business Awards 2022 in Best Business Book category, a silver Stevie at the American Business Awards 2022 in the Best Business Book category. Also, the book won the 2022 CK Prahalad Best Business Book Awards at the Bangalore Business Literature Festival.

Recognitions 
In 2021, Nitin was listed as one of the 100 Most Inspiring People in the Life Sciences Industry by PharmaVoice.

References

Indian Institute of Management Lucknow alumni
IIT Delhi alumni
Living people
Indian chief executives
McKinsey & Company people
Flipkart people
Fidelity International
Indian writers
1971 births